RFQ is the initialism for a number of things:

 Radio-frequency quadrupole, a particular setup of electrodes used as a mass analyzer or an element of a linear accelerator.
 Regulatory Focus Questionnaire, a questionnaire designed to measure prevention focus and promotion focus.  
 Request for quotation, a (general) request for a quote to perform work.
 Request for quote, a (specific) financial term when asking a bank for an offer of a financial instrument.
 Request for qualifications, the qualification request for a position, job or work.